Summer Love is a 2019 Pakistan Urdu Language coming-of-age drama web series produced by Cornetto Pakistan. The series follows the life of Nida and Sami who are poles apart. Their worlds collide at an internship, where they initially rub each other the wrong way, but soon find themselves warming up to the other person. The show's distribution rights were acquired by the digital platform Teeli, and it debuted on 4 June 2019.

Cast
Hadi Bin Arshad as Sami
Vardah Aziz as Nida
Babar Jaffri as Kashan
Amtul Baweja as Sana
Durr-e-Shehwar as Sara

References

External links

Pakistani web series
2019 web series debuts
2019 Pakistani television series debuts
Pakistani television films
Urdu-language television shows
Coming-of-age television shows